Ethmia mimihagenella is a moth in the family Depressariidae. It is found in the United States in New Mexico, Arizona and Texas.

The ground color of the forewings is white with a dark pattern.

References

Moths described in 1973
mimihagenella